Erich G. Fritz is a German politician of the Christian Democratic Union (CDU) and former member of the German Bundestag.

Life 
Fritz joined the CDU in 1976. From 1985 to 2009 he was chairman of the Dortmund CDU district association and from 1986 to 2012 he was a member of the Ruhr CDU district executive, most recently as deputy chairman. He is honorary chairman of the Dortmund CDU district association. From 1979 to 1990 Fritz was a member of Dortmund City Council. From 1990 to 2013 he was a member of the German Bundestag. From 1991 to 1998 he was deputy chairman of the Commission of Enquiry on the Protection of Humanity and the Environment and from 1994 to 2002 foreign trade spokesman for the CDU/CSU parliamentary group.

References

External links 

 Homepage

1946 births
Living people
Members of the Bundestag for North Rhine-Westphalia
Members of the Bundestag 2009–2013
Members of the Bundestag 2005–2009
Members of the Bundestag 2002–2005
Members of the Bundestag 1998–2002
Members of the Bundestag 1994–1998
Members of the Bundestag 1990–1994
Members of the Bundestag for the Christian Democratic Union of Germany